Joseph Kingsbury (1600–1676) was an early settler and selectman from Dedham, Massachusetts.

Personal life
Kingsbury was born in Boxford, Suffolk to John Kingsbury. He traveled to Massachusetts in the early 1630s with his younger brother, John Kingsbury, and his wife Millicent, whom he married in Boxford in 1628. He had a daughter, Sarah, born in 1635. Their second daughter, Mary, was the second child ever born in Dedham on September 1, 1637. Their third child, Elizabeth, was born in 1638. Four boys then followed, including Joseph, born 1640, John, born in 1643, Eleazer, born in 1645, and Nathaniel, born in 1650.

Dedham
Kingsbury was one of the ten men who were selected to seek out the "living stones" upon which First Church and Parish in Dedham would be founded. He was found to be "stiff" and "too much addicted to the world," however, and was not selected to be a founding member in 1638. He was later admitted in 1641. Some sources suggest he was displeased with the church after giving the church a valuable plot of land and receiving swamp land in return.

The first portion of the Old Village Cemetery was set apart at the first recorded meeting of the settlers of Dedham on August 18, 1636, with land taken from Kingsbury and Nicholas Phillips. He signed the Dedham Covenant.

He died in 1676.

References

Works cited

Dedham, Massachusetts selectmen
Signers of the Dedham Covenant
1600 births
1676 deaths
People from Boxford, Suffolk
English emigrants to the United States